Jong-ho or Chong-ho is a Korean masculine given name. The meaning differs based on the hanja used to write each syllable of the name. There are 19 hanja with the reading "Jong" and 49 hanja with the reading "Ho" on the South Korean government's official list of hanja which may be registered for use in given names.

People with this name include:

 Ha Jong-ho (born 1963), South Korean boxer
 Kim Chong-hoh (1935–2018), South Korean politician
 Kim Jong-ho (baseball) (born 1984), South Korean baseball player
 Lee Jong-ho (footballer, born 1986), South Korean football player in Southeast Asia
 Lee Jong-ho (footballer, born 1992), South K-League 1 Korean football player
 Lee Jong-ho (engineer), South Korean electronic engineer
 Park Jong-ho (born 1973), South Korean baseball player
 Seo Jong-ho (born 1980), South Korean former field hockey player
 Song Jong-ho (born 1976), South Korean actor
 Song Jong-ho (sport shooter) (born 1990), South Korean sport shooter

See also
 List of Korean given names

References

Korean masculine given names